East Springfield may refer to the following places:

East Springfield, Ohio
East Springfield, Pennsylvania
East Springfield, Springfield, Massachusetts